The men's track time trial cycling event at the 1936 Summer Olympics took place on 8 August and was one of six events at the 1936 Olympics. Nineteen cyclists from 19 nations competed, with each nation limited to one competitor. The event was won by Arie van Vliet of the Netherlands, the nation's first victory in the men's track time trial after two consecutive silver medals in 1924 and 1928. Pierre Georget's silver put France on the podium for the third time. Germany earned its first medal in the event with Rudolf Karsch's bronze.

Background

This was the fourth appearance of the event, which had previously been held in 1896 and every Games since 1928. It would be held every Games until being dropped from the programme after 2004. None of the cyclists from 1932 returned. Arie van Vliet of the Netherlands was the favorite; he had come in second in the sprint at the 1934 and 1935 World Championships and (the day before this competition) the 1936 Games. The sprint winner, Toni Merkens, was not competing in the time trial, however.

Bulgaria, Finland, Hungary, New Zealand, Norway, South Africa, and Sweden each made their debut in the men's track time trial. France and Great Britain each made their fourth appearance, having competed at every appearance of the event.

Competition format

The event was a time trial on the track, with each cyclist competing separately to attempt to achieve the fastest time. Each cyclist raced one kilometre from a standing start.

Records

The following was the Olympic record prior to the competition.

* World records were not tracked by the UCI until 1949.

Arie van Vliet set the new Olympic record at 1:12.0. Pierre Georget also beat the old record.

Schedule

Results

Dimitrov withdrew "owing to bicycle defect."

References

Cycling at the 1936 Summer Olympics
Cycling at the Summer Olympics – Men's track time trial
Track cycling at the 1936 Summer Olympics